In January 2008, Leonard Cohen announced a long-anticipated world tour. It would be Cohen's first tour in 15 years.

Background

2008 tour

13 January 2008, Cohen quietly announced a long-anticipated concert tour.  The tour, Cohen's first in 15 years, began 11 May in Fredericton, New Brunswick to wide critical acclaim, and was extended until Winter of 2010. The schedule of the first leg in Summer of 2008 encompassed Canada and Europe, including performances at The Big Chill, the Montreal Jazz Festival, and on the Pyramid Stage at the 2008 Glastonbury Festival on 29 June 2008. His performance at Glastonbury was hailed by many as the highlight of the festival, and his performance of "Hallelujah" as the sun went down received a rapturous reception and a lengthy ovation from a packed Pyramid Stage field. He also played two shows in London's O2 Arena, and in Dublin he gave a "milestone concert", while in Dublin he was the first performer to play an open-air concert at IMMA (Royal Hospital Kilmainham) ground, performing there on 13, 14 and 15 June 2008. In 2009, the performances were awarded Ireland's Meteor Music Award as the best international performance of the year.

In September, October and November 2008, Cohen gave a marathon tour of Europe, including stops in Austria, Ireland, Poland, Romania, Italy, Germany, and Scandinavia. In London, he played two more shows at the O2 Arena and two additional shows at the Royal Albert Hall.
On 16 July 2008 Leonard Cohen also performed on the promenade of Edinburgh Castle Scotland to rapturous applause.

2009 tour
The third leg of Cohen's World Tour 2008–2009 encompassed New Zealand and Australia from 20 January to 10 February 2009. In January 2009, The Pacific Tour first came to New Zealand. Simon Sweetman in The Dominion Post (Wellington) of 21 January wrote "It is hard work having to put this concert in to words so I'll just say something I have never said in a review before and will never say again: this was the best show I have ever seen." The Sydney Entertainment Centre show on 28 January sold out rapidly, which motivated promoters to announce a second show at the venue. The first performance was well-received, and the audience of 12,000 responded with five standing ovations. In response to hearing about the devastation to the Yarra Valley region of Victoria in Australia, Cohen donated $200,000 to the Victorian Bushfire Appeal in support of those affected by the extensive Black Saturday bushfires that razed the area just weeks after his performance at the Rochford Winery in the A Day on the Green concert. Melbourne's Herald Sun newspaper reported: "Tour promoter Frontier Touring said $200,000 would be donated on behalf of Cohen, fellow performer Paul Kelly and Frontier to aid victims of the bushfires."

On 19 February 2009, Cohen played his first American concert in fifteen years at the Beacon Theatre in New York City. The show, showcased as the special performance for fans, Leonard Cohen Forum members and press, was the only show in the whole three-year tour which was broadcast on the radio (NPR) and available as the free podcast.

The North American Tour of 2009 opened on 1 April and included the performance at the Coachella Valley Music and Arts Festival on Friday, 17 April 2009, in front of one of the largest outdoor theatre crowds in the history of the festival. His performance of Hallelujah was widely regarded as one of the highlights of the festival, thus repeating the major success of the 2008 Glastonbury appearance. The performance has been included on 2010 Songs from the Road live release. During this leg, Cohen regularly performed new song, "Lullaby".

On 1 July 2009, Cohen started his marathon European tour, his third in two years. The itinerary mostly included sport arenas and open air Summer festivals in Germany, UK, France, Spain, Ireland (the show at O2 in Dublin won him the second Meteor Music Award in a row), but also performances in Serbia in the Belgrade Arena, in the Czech Republic, Hungary, Turkey, and again in Romania. On 3 August, Cohen gave an open-air show at the Piazza San Marco in Venice.

On 18 September 2009, on the stage at a concert in Valencia, Spain, Cohen suddenly fainted halfway through performing his song "Bird on the Wire", the fourth in the two-act set list; Cohen was brought down backstage by his band members and then admitted to local hospital, while the concert was suspended. It was reported that Cohen had stomach problems, and possibly food poisoning. Three days later, on 21 September, on his 75th birthday, he performed in Barcelona. The show, last in Europe in 2009 and rumoured to be the last European concert ever, attracted many international fans, who lighted the green candles honouring Cohen's birthday, leading Cohen to give a special speech of thanks for the fans and Leonard Cohen Forum.

The last concert of this leg was held in Ramat Gan, Israel, on 24 September, three days after Cohen's 75th birthday, at Ramat Gan Stadium. The event was surrounded by public discussion due to a cultural boycott of Israel proposed by a number of musicians. Nevertheless, tickets for the Tel Aviv concert, Cohen's first performance in Israel since 1980, sold out in less than 24 hours. It was announced that the proceeds from the sale of the 47,000 tickets would go into a charitable fund in partnership with Amnesty International and would be used by Israeli and Palestinian peace groups for projects providing health services to children and bringing together Israeli veterans and former Palestinian fighters and the families of those killed in the conflict. However, on 17 August 2009, Amnesty International released a statement saying they were withdrawing from any involvement with the concert and its proceeds. Amnesty International later stated that its withdrawal was not due to the boycott but "the lack of support from Israeli and Palestinian NGOs." The Palestinian Campaign for the Academic and Cultural Boycott of Israel (PACBI) led the call for the boycott, claiming that Cohen was "intent on whitewashing Israel's colonial apartheid regime by performing in Israel." On 24 September at the Ramat Gan concert, Cohen was highly emotional about the Israeli-Palestinian NGO Bereaved Families for Peace. He mentioned the organization twice, saying "It was a while ago that I first heard of the work of the 'Bereaved Parents for Peace'. That there was this coalition of Palestinian and Israeli families who had lost so much in the conflict and whose depth of suffering had compelled them to reach across the border into the houses of the enemy. Into the houses of those, to locate them who had suffered as much as they had, and then to stand with them in aching confraternity, a witness to an understanding that is beyond peace and that is beyond confrontation. So, this is not about forgiving and forgetting, this is not about laying down one's arms in a time of war, this is not even about peace, although, God willing, it could be a beginning. This is about a response to human grief. A radical, unique and holy, holy, holy response to human suffering. Baruch Hashem, thank God, I bow my head in respect to the nobility of this enterprise." At the end of the show he blessed the crowd by the Priestly Blessing, a Jewish blessing offered by Kohanim. Cohen's surname derives from this Hebrew word for priest, thus identifying him as a Kohen.

The sixth leg of the 2008–2009 world tour went again to US, with fifteen shows in October and November, with the "final" show in San Jose. The final leg included two new songs, "Feels So Good" and "The Darkness". But at that point, Cohen's "World Tour 2010" was already announced with the European dates in March.

The 2009 world tour earned a reported $9.5 million, putting Cohen at number 39 on Billboard magazine's list of the year's top musical "money makers."

2010 tour
Cohen's 2008–2009 world tour was prolonged into 2010. Originally scheduled to start in March, the first dozen of the original European dates were postponed to September and October due to Cohen's lower-back injury. Officially billed as the "World Tour 2010", the tour started on 25 July 2010 in Arena Zagreb, Croatia, where in the week of the show 16 of Cohen's albums simultaneously entered the Croatian Top 40, while Cohen's work was presented by the translation of Book of Mercy, two of Cohen's biographies, and with selection of poems in major literary magazine Quorum, while there was also the translation of Linda Hutcheon's work on Cohen's literary output. In December 2010, the national daily newspaper Vjesnik ranked Cohen's show among the five most important cultural event in Croatia in 2010, in the poll among dozen of intellectuals and writers; it was the only event ranked which was not actually Croatian. The tour continued through August, with stops in Austria, Belgium, Germany, Scandinavia, and Ireland, where on 31 July & 1 August 2010 Cohen performed at Lissadell House in County Sligo. It was Cohen's ninth Irish concert in just two years after a hiatus of more than 20 years. On 12 August, Cohen played the 200th show of the tour in Scandinavium, Gothenburg, Sweden, where he had already played in October 2008; the show was four hours long.

The Fall leg of the European tour started in early September with an open-air show in Florence, Italy, and continued through Germany, Portugal, Spain, Switzerland, and Austria, where Cohen performed at the famous open-air opera stage of Römersteinbruch bei St. Margarethen im Burgenland, and then continued with dates in France, Poland, Russia (Moscow's State Kremlin Palace), Slovenia and Slovakia. In Slovenia's brand new Arena Stožice, Cohen accepted Croatia's Porin music award for best foreign live video programme, which he won for his Live in London DVD. Cohen's last European show was held in Sibamac Arena, in Bratislava, Slovakia. The shows in late September and October were performed without Sharon Robinson, who left this tour leg due to heavy illness; the setlist omitted songs co-written by her, but old Cohen standards were added instead.

The third leg of the 2010 tour started on 28 October in New Zealand and continued in Australia, including an open-air concert at Hanging Rock near Melbourne. It was the first show ever organised at the site. The tour finished with seven special dates added in Vancouver, Portland, Victoria and Oakland, with two final shows in Las Vegas' The Colosseum at Caesars Palace on 10 and 11 December. The very last concert on 11 December was the 246th show on the world tour which started on 11 May 2008.

Live releases

Live in London
On 31 March 2009, Cohen released Live in London, recorded on 17 July 2008 at London's O2 Arena and released on DVD and as a two-CD set. The album contains 25 songs and is over two-and-a-half hours long. It was the first official DVD in Cohen's recording career. The quotation on the album referred to one hundred five-star reviews the tour gained in the international press in 2008.

Songs From the Road
Songs From the Road appeared roughly 14 months after releasing Live in London , which preserved Cohen's July 2008 performance at London's O2 Arena.  This collection features 12 songs from his 2008 and 2009 concert dates, and while this album isn't exactly a collection of rarities, it does feature a number of lesser-known tunes (such as "Heart with No Companion" and "That Don't Make It Junk") and variant versions of some of his more famous numbers (Cohen juggles the order of the verses on "Suzanne" and adds a new verse to "Bird on a Wire").  The selections were taken from a wide variety of locations, including Tel Aviv, Scotland, Finland, and Cohen's native Canada.

Set lists

2008 set list
This set list is representative of the performance on November 13, 2008 in London, England. It does not represent all concerts for the duration of the tour.

"Dance Me to the End of Love"
"The Future"
"Ain't No Cure for Love"
"Bird on the Wire"
"Everybody Knows"
"In My Secret Life"
"Who by Fire"
"Hey, That's No Way to Say Goodbye"
"That Don't Make It Junk"
"Anthem"
Intermission
"Tower of Song"
"Suzanne"
"The Gypsy's Wife"
"The Partisan"
"Boogie Street"
"Hallelujah"
"I'm Your Man"
"A Thousand Kisses Deep"
"Take This Waltz"
Encore
"So Long, Marianne"
"First We Take Manhattan"
"Famous Blue Raincoat"
"If It Be Your Will"
"Democracy"
"I Tried to Leave You"
"Whither Thou Goest"

2009 set list
This set list is representative of the performance on October 23, 2009 in New York City, New York. It does not represent all concerts for the duration of the tour.

"Dance Me to the End of Love"
"The Future"
"Ain't No Cure for Love"
"Bird on the Wire"
"Everybody Knows"
"In My Secret Life"
"Who by Fire"
"Chelsea Hotel #2"
"Waiting for the Miracle"
"The Flood"
"Anthem"
Intermission
"Tower of Song"
"Suzanne"
"Sisters of Mercy"
"The Gypsy's Wife"
"The Partisan"
"Boogie Street"
"Hallelujah"
"I'm Your Man"
"A Thousand Kisses"
"Take This Waltz"
Encores
"So Long, Marianne"
"First We Take Manhattan"
"Famous Blue Raincoat"
"If It Be Your Will"
"Closing Time"
"I Tried to Leave You"

2010 set list
This set list is representative of the performance on November 30, 2010 in Victoria, British Columbia. It does not represent all concerts for the duration of the tour.

"Dance Me to the End of Love"
"The Future"
"Ain't No Cure for Love"
"Bird on the Wire"
"Everybody Knows"
"In My Secret Life"
"Who by Fire"
"Darkness"
"Chelsea Hotel #2"
"Waiting for the Miracle"
"Anthem"
Intermission
"Tower of Song"
"Suzanne"
"Avalanche"
"A Singer Must Die"
"Sisters of Mercy"
"The Gypsy's Wife"
"The Partisan"
"Boogie Street"
"Hallelujah"
"I'm Your Man"
"A Thousand Kisses Deep"
"Take This Waltz"
Encores
"So Long, Marianne"
"If It Be Your Will"
"Closing Time"
"I Tried to Leave You"

Tour dates

Cancellations and rescheduled shows

Notes

Musicians
Leonard Cohen – vocals, acoustic guitar, keyboard
Roscoe Beck – bass, backing vocals, musical director
Sharon Robinson – vocals
Rafael Bernardo Gayol – drums, percussion
Neil Larsen – keyboards, accordion
Javier Mas – laúd, bandurria, guitar
Bob Metzger – guitar, pedal steel guitar, backing vocals
Dino Soldo – saxophone, clarinet, harmonica, keyboard, backing vocals
Charley Webb – backing vocals, guitar
Hattie Webb – backing vocals, harp

References

2008 concert tours
2009 concert tours
2010 concert tours
Leonard Cohen concert tours
Concerts at Malmö Arena